The Road is a 1955 Soviet action film directed by Aleksandr Stolper and starring Andrei Popov and Nikolai Gritsenko.

Cast
 Andrei Popov  as Sergei Ignatyevich Baitalin
 Vitaly Doronin as Fyodor Ivanovich 
 Nikolai Gritsenko  as Ivan Alekseyevich
 Tamara Loginova as Yekaterina Andreyevna Fyodorova
 Lev Sverdlin  as Beimbetov
 Viktor Avdyushko  as Vasya
 Yevgeny Matveyev as Grigory Ivanovich Polipchuk 
 Yevgeny Leonov as Pasha Yeskov 
 Nikolai Sergeyev as Pavel Petrovich Falkovsky
 Vladimir Kenigson as Reginald Snyders

References

Bibliography 
 Rollberg, Peter. Historical Dictionary of Russian and Soviet Cinema. Scarecrow Press, 2008.

External links 
 

1955 films
Soviet action films
1950s action films
1950s Russian-language films
Films directed by Aleksandr Stolper